Pearl Harbor National Memorial is a unit of the National Park System of the United States on the island of Oahu, Hawaii. The John D. Dingell, Jr. Conservation, Management, and Recreation Act removed the site from the World War II Valor in the Pacific National Monument on March 12, 2019, and made it a separate national memorial.

The site commemorates the events of the Attack on Pearl Harbor on December 7, 1941, which killed over 2,400 Americans and sank twelve ships. The site includes the USS Arizona Memorial, the USS Utah memorial, the USS Oklahoma memorial, six chief petty officer bungalows on Ford Island, mooring quays F6, F7, and F8, which formed part of Battleship Row, and the visitor center at Halawa Landing.

A visitor center and park features galleries on the Pacific theater of World War II, a theater showing a film about the attack, and memorial sculpture. Visitors may take a ferry to the Arizona memorial.

Nearby are the USS Missouri memorial, USS Bowfin museum, and Pearl Harbor Aviation Museum, which are designated historic attractions within the Pearl Harbor Naval Complex.

See also
 List of national memorials of the United States

References

External links 

 Official site

National Memorials of the United States
World War II memorials in the United States
Monuments and memorials on the National Register of Historic Places in Hawaii
National Park Service areas in Hawaii
Monuments and memorials in Hawaii
Protected areas established in 2019
2019 establishments in Hawaii